Meichi Narasaki (楢﨑 明智 Narasaki Meichi, born May 13, 1999) is a Japanese professional sport climber and boulderer.

His older brother Tomoa Narasaki is also a professional sport climber.

Rankings

Climbing World Championships

Asian Championships

Youth World Championships

See also
List of grade milestones in rock climbing
History of rock climbing
Rankings of most career IFSC gold medals

References

External links 

Japanese rock climbers
Living people
1999 births